Kentucky Route 2054 (KY 2054) is a  state highway in the U.S. State of Kentucky. Its western terminus is a continuation as Algonquin Parkway at South 40th Street, which leads to Interstate 264 (I-264), in Louisville and its eastern terminus is at U.S. Route 60 Alternate (US 60 Alt.) in Louisville.

Major junctions

References

2054
2054
Transportation in Louisville, Kentucky